General Treviño is a municipality in northern Mexico.

General Treviño originated from a ranch named “El Puntiagudo” that was given to Don Juan Baptista Chapa on 14 January 1688. Don Francisco Chapa made the foundation in 1705. Its erection in the villa was verified on 9 December 1868, being Governor of the State Nuevo León, General Jerónimo Treviño; it belonged to the villas founded during the 19th century. The main reason for its foundation was agriculture.

General Trevino borders to the North and the West with Agualeguas, Nuevo León and Ciudad Mier, Tamaulipas; to the South with Melchor Ocampo and to the East with Los Aldamas.

The traditional foods of General Trevino include the Elote tamale, the “carne seca” and the “cabrito”. The typical candy is  made of “fríjol” (bean).

General Treviño contains approximately 1,800 inhabitants. There are 49 localities in the municipality, of which most importantly are: San Javier, Rancho El Faro, Buena Vista and Los Maldonado.

Municipalities of Nuevo León